"" (literally: With seriousness, you Children of Man) is an Advent hymn by . It partly paraphrases the call to penitence by John the Baptist. The text was first published in 1642 in the collection Preußische Festlieder. The different melody that later became popular dates back to 1557.

History 
His text was first published by Johann Stobäus in the 1642 collection Preußische Festlieder (Prussian festive songs), with an art song melody by Stobäus. In East Prussia, the song was also sung with a melody by Johannes Eccard. The melody in modern hymnals goes back to the French song "Une Jeune Pucelle" that appeared in Lyon in 1557. It was first used for a hymn by Ludwig Helmbold in 1563, associated with "Von Gott will ich nicht lassen".

The hymn is part of the common Protestant hymnal Evangelisches Gesangbuch as EG 10. The common Catholic hymnal Gotteslob included the song in the first 1975 edition as GL 113 in three stanzas, omitting the third, and in a slightly modified version. In the 2013 edition, it appears no longer in the Stammteil (root part), but in regional sections. In the Diocese of Stuttgart, GL 752 has all four stanzas, in the modified version. In the Diocese of Limburg, GL 748 is copied from the 1975 version. It is also part of other hymnals and song books.

Text 
Thilo wrote four stanzas of four lines each.

However, this fourth stanza was replaced in the 1657 edition of the Hannoversches Gesangbuch (Hanover hymnal) by a different stanza, a prayer for the right attitude of repentance, looking at the stable and the manger of the nativity.

The text in modern Protestant hymnals is: 

The third stanza, pointing out that a "humble" heart is closer to God than a "proud" heart, has been compared to text from the Magnificat, Mary's song of praise.

References

Further reading 
 Johannes Kulp (eds. Arno Büchner and Siegfried Fornaçon): Die Lieder unserer Kirche. Eine Handreichung zum Evangelischen Kirchengesangbuch. Vandenhoeck & Ruprecht, Göttingen 1958, pp. 27–28.

Advent songs
Lutheran hymns
1653 works
17th-century hymns in German